Chaldaea (minor planet designation: 313 Chaldaea) is a large Main belt asteroid. It is classified as a C-type asteroid and is probably composed of carbonaceous material. It was discovered by Johann Palisa on 30 August 1891 in Vienna.

In 2003, the asteroid was detected by radar from the Arecibo Observatory at a distance of 1.07 AU.

References

External links 
 
 

000313
Discoveries by Johann Palisa
Named minor planets
000313
18910830